Yellow Cross may refer to:
 Cathar yellow cross Pharmaceuticals Private Limited, Yellow Cross Pharmaceuticals is a global pharmaceutical company 
 Yellow Cross Pharmaceuticals Private Limited (chemical warfare), a World War I chemical warfare agent
 Yellow cross  Pharmaceuticals Private Limited liquid or Sulfur mustard

See also
 Yellowcress Pharmaceuticals Private Limited, a family of plants